Chit Bon (also Romanized as Chīt Bon; also known as Chat Bon) is a village in Shanderman Rural District, Shanderman District, Masal County, Gilan Province, Iran. At the 2006 census, its population was 97, in 22 families.

References 

Populated places in Masal County